MacAskill, also spelt Macaskill, is a surname. It is an Anglicisation of the Gaelic Mac Asgaill, meaning "son of Asgall". The Gaelic name Asgall is a reduced form of the Old Norse personal name Ásketill, son of Torquil. Asketil was the last Viking King of Dublin, Ireland. He died circa 1171-2, resisting the English invaders of Ireland under King Henry II. He had placed his family under the protection of the Norse King of Man, and his grandson, Gilbert MacAsgaill, led a party sent by the King of Man to occupy and hold Dunscaith Castle, on the Sleat Peninsula, Isle of Skye. These are the first members of the name we can find in Scotland. The name is borne by a noted family on Skye, the MacAskills of Rubha an Dùnain, who historically followed the MacLeods of Dunvegan, possibly serving them as early as the fourteenth century (although documentation is lacking). In Gaelic the MacAskills are known as Clann t-Ascaill, and Clann t-Asgaill. In Scottish Gaelic, the surname is rendered MacAsgaill. In Irish, the surname is rendered Mac Ascaill. Early forms of the name on record in Scotland are Mackaiscail (in 1766), Mackaiscal (in 1769), and Macaiskill (in 1790). An early form of the name in England is Mac Askil (in 1311).

Notable persons with the name include:
Angus MacAskill (1825–1863),  Scottish born Canadian giant Gael, the tallest non-pathological giant and the strongest man who ever lived according to the Guinness book of world records 
Claire McCaskill (born 1953), American politician from Missouri
Danny MacAskill (born 1985), Scottish stunt cyclist
Dianne Macaskill, New Zealand archivist
Glenn Macaskill, Zimbabwean-South African writer
Ishbel MacAskill (1941–2011), Scottish singer
J. D. McAskill (1907–1994), Canadian educator and politician
Kenny MacAskill (born 1958),  Scottish politician
Klara MacAskill (born 1964), Hungarian-Canadian sprint canoer
Ewen MacAskill (born 1952), Scottish journalist
William MacAskill (born 1987), Scottish philosopher and author
W. R. Macaskill (1887–1956), Canadian photographer

See also
MacAskills Lake, Inverness County, Nova Scotia, Canada
McCaskill (disambiguation)

Citations

References

Anglicised Scottish Gaelic-language surnames
English-language surnames
Scottish surnames